The 2015 Dallas municipal election was an election to determine the mayor in Dallas, Texas. The election day was May 9, 2015, and if a runoff election had been required, it would have been held on June 13, 2015. Incumbent Democratic Mayor Mike Rawlings ran and won re-election to a second term in office against challengers Marcos Ronquillo, an attorney, and write-in candidate Richard Sheridan, a retired engineer and anti-gay government activist.
 
Six of the current 14 members of the City Council ran unopposed, but eight other seats were contested. Historically less than 10% of voters participate in Dallas City Council elections, although 9 days of early voting were provided from April 27 through May 5. The Dallas County Elections office has published a map of these polling locations for reference.

Mayor

Candidates
Mike Rawlings (incumbent)
Marcos Ronquillo
Richard P. Sheridan (write-in)

Results

District 1
Scott Griggs (incumbent)

District 2
Adam Medrano (incumbent)

District 3
(incumbent termed out)
Casey Thomas, II
Gerald Britt	 	 
Joe Tave
Wini Cannon	 
B.D. Howard

District 4
(incumbent termed out)
Stephen King 
Linda M. Wilkerson-Wynn  	 
Sandra Crenshaw	 
Keyaira D. Saunders
James Ross
D. Marcus Ranger
Carl Hays
Carolyn King Arnold

District 5
Jesse Diaz
Rick Callahan (incumbent)
Sherry Cordova

District 6
Ozumba Lnuk-X
Daniel "DC" Caldwell, I
Lakolya London
Monica R. Alonzo (incumbent)

District 7
(incumbent termed out)
Tiffinni A. Young	 	 
Hasani Burton	 
John Lawson 	 
Kevin Felder 	 
James "J.T." Turknett  	 
Randall Parker 
Baranda J. Fermin	 
Juanita Wallace

District 8
(incumbent termed out)
Dianne Gibson	 	 
Clara McDade
Subrina Lynn Brenham
Eric Lemonte Williams	 
Gail Terrell	 
Erik Wilson

District 9
(incumbent termed out)
Christopher Jackson	 
Darren Boruff 
Mark Clayton	 
Sam Merten
Will Logg

District 10
(incumbent termed out) 
James N. White	 	 
Paul Reyes	 
Adam McGough

District 11
Lee M. Kleinman (incumbent)

District 12
Sandy Greyson (incumbent)

District 13
Jennifer Staubach Gates (incumbent)

District 14
Philip T. Kingston (incumbent)

References

Dallas Municipal
Dallas Municipal
2015
2010s in Dallas